Davik may refer to:

Places
Davik, a former municipality in Sogn og Fjordane county, Norway
Davik (village), a village in Bremanger municipality in Sogn og Fjordane county, Norway
Davik Church, a church in Bremanger municipality in Sogn og Fjordane county, Norway

People
Ingebrigt Davik (1925—1991), a Norwegian teacher, children's writer, broadcasting personality, singer and songwriter
Davik Kang, a fictional character in the Star Wars: Knights of the Old Republic series